Marvin John Vogel (born 29 December 1985) is a former Zimbabwean cricketer. A right-handed batsman and right-arm leg break bowler, he played one first-class match for Manicaland during the 2003–04 Logan Cup, with his side losing to Matabeleland.

References

External links
 
 

1985 births
Living people
Cricketers from Mutare
Zimbabwean cricketers
Manicaland cricketers